Kateřina Holánová (born 13 October 1977) is a Czech film and stage actress. At the 2005 Thalia Awards she won the category of Best Actress in a Play, for the role of Rebecca West in the production of Rosmersholm. She studied at the Brno Conservatory before starting to perform at the Klicperovo divadlo in Hradec Králové, then moving on to the National Theatre Brno in 2004. Holánová's role in the 2003 film Boredom in Brno earned her a nomination for Best Leading Actress at the 2003 Czech Lion Awards.

Selected filmography
Boredom in Brno (2003)
Hrubeš a Mareš jsou kamarádi do deště (2005)

References

External links

1977 births
Living people
Czech film actresses
People from Boskovice
21st-century Czech actresses
Czech stage actresses
Recipients of the Thalia Award
Brno Conservatory alumni